In MS-DOS and Microsoft Windows, filespec is a term meaning a filename identifier that specifies both the name and location of a single file.

The filespec differs from the filename in that the filespec includes a complete specification, within a particular file system, of the file's location. Thus, win.com is a filename and C:\Windows\win.com is a filespec.

The term originates from Digital Research CP/M operating system. From the CP/M Plus Command Reference Manual:

 CP/M Plus identifies every file by its complete name or file specification. A file specification is any valid combination of the drive specification, filename, filetype, and password, all separated by their appropriate delimiters. A drive letter must be followed by a colon. A filetype must be preceded by a period. A password must be preceded by a semicolon. The term filespec is an abbreviation for file specification.

See also
File system
Long filename
Path (computing)

References

Computer files